Francis "Frank" Hanna (1914–21 November 1987), was an Irish politician.

After studying at St. Mary's Christian Brothers Grammar School, Belfast and Queen's University, Belfast, Hanna became a solicitor, founding Francis Hanna and Co., specialising in personal injuries and trade union cases. A Roman Catholic supportive of a united Ireland, Hanna joined the Nationalist Party and was elected to Belfast City Council.

In 1942, he joined James Collins in defecting to the Northern Ireland Labour Party (NILP), and in a 1946 by-election, he was elected for Belfast Central. Hanna beat Victor Halley of the Socialist Republican Party at the election; the Nationalist Party which had held the seat for many years choosing not to stand.

In 1949, Hanna resigned from the NILP in protest at its support for the partition of Ireland. He was re-elected unopposed as an "Independent Labour" candidate at the 1949 Northern Ireland general election, and shortly afterwards became the vice-chairman of the new Northern Section of the Irish Labour Party. He resigned from the party soon afterwards. In 1958, he set up his own Independent Labour Group, with support from various Catholic clerics. In 1964, he was one of the original supporters of Unity, but he stood down at the 1965 Northern Ireland general election.

He was the father of the Irish political journalist Vincent Hanna.

References

External links
Michael Farrell, Northern Ireland: The Orange State
Northern Ireland Parliamentary Elections Result: Biographies 
Francis Hanna & Co Solicitors: The History
Graham S. Walker, The Politics of Frustration: Harry Midgley and the Failure of Labour in Northern Ireland
Enda Staunton, The Nationalists of Northern Ireland 1918–1973

1914 births
1987 deaths
Labour Party (Ireland) members of the House of Commons of Northern Ireland
Irish solicitors
Members of the House of Commons of Northern Ireland 1945–1949
Members of the House of Commons of Northern Ireland 1949–1953
Members of the House of Commons of Northern Ireland 1953–1958
Members of the House of Commons of Northern Ireland 1958–1962
Members of the House of Commons of Northern Ireland 1962–1965
Northern Ireland Labour Party members of the House of Commons of Northern Ireland
Independent members of the House of Commons of Northern Ireland
People educated at St. Mary's Christian Brothers' Grammar School, Belfast
20th-century Irish lawyers
Members of the House of Commons of Northern Ireland for Belfast constituencies